The 1920 South American Championships in Athletics  were held in Santiago, Chile between 23 and 25 April.

Medal summary

Men's events

Medal table

External links
 Men Results – GBR Athletics
 Women Results – GBR Athletics

1920 in athletics (track and field)
1920
International athletics competitions hosted by Chile
1920 in South American sport
1920 in Chilean sport